Bujeon Station is a station of the Busan Metro Line 1 in Bujeon-dong, Busanjin District, Busan, South Korea. The station is unrelated to the Bujeon Station of Korail.

Station Layout

Vicinity
 Exit 1: Yeongjamyeonok Bujeon Branch
 Exit 2: EDIYA Coffee Busan Jeonpo
 Exit 3: Jageumseong, Bujeon Building Materials
 Exit 4: Compose Coffee Bujeon Station
 Exit 5: Songha Restaurant, Heung-a Electronic Shopping Center
 Exit 6: National Health Insurance Corporation, Busan Plus Hair Center Wig Story
 Exit 7: Busan Metropolitan City Vehicle Registration Office Bujeon Station Field Complaint Center
 Exit 8: Ten percent

References

External links
 Cyber station information from Busan Transportation Corporation

Railway stations in Busan
Busanjin District
Busan Metro stations
Railway stations in South Korea opened in 1985